Andrew D. Leipold is an American lawyer, focusing in criminal law, criminal procedure and juries and jury behavior, currently the Edwin M. Adams Professor of Law at University of Illinois and formerly the editor-in-chief of Virginia Law Review.

Education 
JD University of Virginia
BS Boston University

References 

Year of birth missing (living people)
Living people
University of Illinois faculty
American lawyers
Boston University alumni
University of Virginia School of Law alumni